Nocardiopsis arvandica  is a bacterium from the genus of Nocardiopsis which has been isolated from sandy soil from the Arvand River in Khoramshahr in Iran.

References

Further reading

External links
Type strain of Nocardiopsis arvandica at BacDive -  the Bacterial Diversity Metadatabase	

Actinomycetales
Bacteria described in 2011